Princess Prabai Bannabilas  (13 August 1885 – 17 September 1886) was the Princess of Siam (later Thailand). She was a member of the Siamese Royal Family. She was a daughter of Chulalongkorn, King Rama V of Siam.

Her mother was Chao Chom Manda Phrom (daughter of Phraya Phitsanuloka Thibodi). She had 3 siblings, 1 elder sister, 1 younger brother and 1 younger sister:
 Princess Prabha Bannabilaya (13 August 1885 – 8 September 1948) Princess Prabai Bannabilas' twin elder sister.
 Prince Samaya Vudhirodom (13 September 1888 – 9 December 1889)
 Princess Vapi Busbakara (25 June 1891 – 15 December 1982)

Princess Prabha Bannabilaya and Princess Prabai Bannabilas were the only set of twins of King Chulalongkorn, and they were the fourth set of twins in Chakri Dynasty. The three previous set of twins were:
 Prince and Princess twin of Prince Boworn Maha Senanurak and Chao Chom Manda Sabaya, they died soon after birth in 1810
 Princess twins of King Buddha Loetla Nabhalai and Chao Chom Manda Nhu Chin, died a week after birth in 1811
 Prince twins of Prince Yodyingyos, the Prince Bowornwichaicharn and Chao Chom Manda Mom Luang Prik Chesdankura, died a year after birth in 1857.

Princess Prabai Bannabilas suffered from a terrible illness and died on 17 September 1886, at the age of 1 year and 1 month. The Royal Crematorium was created in Wat Ratchabophit by her uncle Prince Bhanurangsi Savangwongse, the Prince Bhanubhandhubongse Voradej, and the cremation ceremony was performed by her father, King Chulalongkorn on 29 December 1886.

Ancestry

1885 births
1886 deaths
19th-century Thai royalty who died as children
19th-century Chakri dynasty
Thai female Phra Ong Chao
Children of Chulalongkorn
Daughters of kings